Mohammad Fazeli (also Romanized as "Mohammad Fāzeli"; born 16 September 1975 in Arak, Iran) is an Iranian sociologist and former assistant professor at Shahid Beheshti University whose work focuses on social impact assessment, political sociology and sociology of science. He got fired from university in the "third wave of purging political professors".
He is advisor to Iranian Minister of Energy. 
Fazeli was the research deputy of Iranian Center for Strategic Studies and the general editor of the Network for Public Policy Studies (NPPS).

References

External links
 

Living people
Iranian sociologists
Tarbiat Modares University alumni
Amirkabir University of Technology alumni
1975 births
Academic staff of Shahid Beheshti University
Iranian environmentalists